The 2000–01 Euro Hockey Tour was the fifth season of the Euro Hockey Tour. The season consisted of four tournaments, the Česká Pojišťovna Cup, Karjala Tournament, Baltica Brewery Cup, and the Sweden Hockey Games.

Tournaments

Česká Pojišťovna Cup
Finland won the Česká Pojišťovna Cup.

Karjala Tournament
Finland won the Karjala Tournament.

Baltica Brewery Cup
Russia won the Baltica Brewery Cup.

Sweden Hockey Games
Sweden won the Sweden Hockey Games. Canada also participated in the tournament. The games they participated in did not count towards the final standings of the Euro Hockey Tour.

Final standings

References
Euro Hockey Tour website

Euro Hockey Tour
2000–01 in European ice hockey
2000–01 in Canadian ice hockey
2000–01 in Russian ice hockey
2000–01 in Czech ice hockey
2000–01 in Swedish ice hockey
2000–01 in Finnish ice hockey